Neoptychodes trilineatus is a species of flat-faced longhorn beetles in the subfamily Lamiinae.

Description
The body coloration is quite variable through the wide range of this species. Usually the background is greyish or dark brown with orange-brown elytral spots and three white or yellow longitudinal bands (hence the Latin name trilineatus). Main host plants are Ficus carica, Morus microphylla, Salix sp. and Alnus sp.

Distribution
This species can be found in Belize, Costa Rica, Cuba, Guatemala, Guyana, Honduras, Nicaragua, Suriname, United States and Venezuela.

References

Lamiini
Beetles described in 1771
Taxa named by Carl Linnaeus